This is a list of events in the year 2017 in Sierra Leone.

Incumbents
 President: Ernest Bai Koroma

Events
14 August – The 2017 Sierra Leone mudslides in and around Freetown resulted in hundreds of fatalities.
16 August - A mass burial of victims of the mudslides took place in Freetown. Over 600 people are still reportedly missing.

Deaths

1 June – J. B. Dauda, politician (b. 1942).

References

 
2010s in Sierra Leone 
Years of the 21st century in Sierra Leone 
Sierra Leone
Sierra Leone